Confidential Agent is a 1945 American spy film starring Charles Boyer and Lauren Bacall which was a Warner Brothers production. The movie was directed by Herman Shumlin and produced by Robert Buckner with Jack L. Warner as executive producer. The screenplay was by Robert Buckner, based on the 1939 novel The Confidential Agent by Graham Greene. The music score was by Franz Waxman and the cinematography by James Wong Howe. The supporting cast includes George Coulouris and Peter Lorre.

Plot
In the midst of the Spanish Civil War, Luis Denard (Charles Boyer), a former concert pianist and composer, travels to England as a confidential agent of the  Republican government. His mission is to buy coal or to deny it to the Fascist rebels. On the ship, he meets bored rich girl Rose Cullen (Lauren Bacall), whose father, Lord Benditch (Holmes Herbert), heads the firm with which Denard will negotiate.

On the road to London, he is beaten and robbed by Fascist agents, who do not find the documents he hid in his shoe. At his hotel he enlists the aid of the young maid, Else (Wanda Hendrix), who hides his documents in her stocking. When he meets his contacts, Contreras (Peter Lorre) and Maria Melandez (Katina Paxinou), he finds they have sold out to the Fascists and want him discredited or killed. They kill the maid, for which Denard takes revenge. Contreras dies of a heart attack as Denard prepares to shoot him, after which Mrs. Melandez takes poison.

Unable to buy any coal, Denard tries to persuade the miners to support their fellow workers in Spain, but they put work ahead of principle. His mission a failure, Rose gets an admirer to help him leave the country secretly. Reaching the coast at Bexhill-on-Sea, he learns that Benditch's firm have repudiated their contract with the Fascists, so he has succeeded after all. On the ship, he finds Rose, to whose life he has given meaning.

Cast

 Charles Boyer as Luis Denard
 Lauren Bacall as Rose Cullen
 Katina Paxinou as Mrs. Melandez
 Victor Francen as Licata
 Wanda Hendrix as Else
 George Coulouris as Captain Currie
 Peter Lorre as Contreras
 John Warburton as Neil Forbes
 Holmes Herbert as Lord Benditch
 Dan Seymour as Mr. Muckerji
 Art Foster as Chauffeur
 Miles Mander as Mr. Brigstock
 Lawrence Grant as Lord Fetting
 Ian Wolfe as Dr. Bellows
 George Zucco as Detective Geddes
 Gordon Richards as Immigration Officer (uncredited)
 Marie De Becker as Miner's Wife (uncredited)
 John Goldsworthy as Beggar (uncredited)

Production
The screenplay was based on a Graham Greene novel, of the same name. There is evidence of jump cuts, which suggest that editing, to get the running time under two hours, did not help.  Though regarded as overly long, the film remains true to Greene's original story.

Reception

Critical response
According to "The Big Sleep Comparisons 1945/46", a featurette on the 2000 DVD release of Bacall's film The Big Sleep, her reviews for Confidential Agent were largely negative, with particular aspersions cast on Bacall's performance, as a "pretty amateur".

According to film historian Robert Gitt, host of the featurette, Warner studio head Jack L. Warner was lobbied to order certain scenes in The Big Sleep re-shot in order to rectify performance issues with Bacall identified in Confidential Agent, which he did.

In her own autobiography, Bacall said that she begged not to have to do the film, but couldn't break her contract that early, though her career never fully recovered from Confidential Agent.

Graham Greene's response
Greene, generally critical of film adaptations of his works, disagreed with the critics.  In 1979, when Philip Purser returned to the question of the casting of Bacall in The Sunday Telegraph, Greene responded and commended the acting of both Bacall and Boyer.  He also praised Shumlin as the only American director to make a good film from one of his stories.  In a letter to the paper entitled "An Honourable Performance", Greene wrote:

Mr Philip Purser writes that Lauren Bacall was 'insanely miscast in her third picture The [sic] Confidential Agent and having given—as she admits—a lousy performance, she nevertheless bitterly resented the cool notices that came her way'. I also as the author of the book resent those cool notices. This remains the only good film ever made from one of my books by an American director and Miss Bacall gave an admirable performance and so did Charles Boyer.

References

External links
 
 
 
 
 Confidential Agent film review by Dan Stumpf in Mystery*File
 

1945 films
1940s spy drama films
American spy drama films
American black-and-white films
Films scored by Franz Waxman
Films based on British novels
Films based on thriller novels
Films based on works by Graham Greene
Spanish Civil War films
Warner Bros. films
Films set in London
Films set in Kent
1945 drama films
1940s English-language films
1940s American films